The highest-selling albums and EPs in the United States are ranked in the Billboard 200 chart, which is published by Billboard magazine. The data are compiled by Nielsen Soundscan based on each album's weekly physical and digital sales. In 2011, 30 albums advanced to the peak position of the chart.

Singer-songwriter Taylor Swift's Speak Now was the first album to reach the top in 2011, spending four consecutive weeks at the top with 259,000 copies sold, while Michael Bublé's Christmas was the last album to do so, also spending four consecutive weeks there and selling 448,000 copies. The most successful album of the year was Adele's  21, which spent 13 non-consecutive weeks at number one, and sold 5 million copies. The Billboard magazine mentioned 21 as the highest-selling album in the year since 2004, when Usher's Confessions reached sales of 8 million copies. Lady Gaga's Born This Way held the record for the highest first-week total in 2011, with 1,108,000 copies sold in its first week. Lil Wayne's Tha Carter IV had the second-highest first-week total in 2011, with 964,000 copies.

Chart history

See also
2011 in music
List of Hot 100 number-one singles of 2011 (U.S.)

References 

2011
United States Albums